Richard Conroy (born 12 November 1933) is a former Irish Fianna Fáil politician and businessman. He was elected to Seanad Éireann on the Cultural and Educational Panel in 1977 and served until 1981. He was again elected to the Seanad in 1989 on the Industrial and Commercial Panel and served until 1993. He lost his seat at the 1993 Seanad election, and was an unsuccessful candidate at the 1997 Seanad election.

He was a member of Dublin County Council for the Ballybrack electoral area from 1991 to 1994, and of Dún Laoghaire–Rathdown County Council from 1994 to 1999. He stood for election to Dáil Éireann for various Dublin constituencies, at five general elections between 1977 and 1987, but was unsuccessful on all occasions.

He is an emeritus professor of physiology in the Royal College of Surgeons in Ireland, and founder and director of Conroy Gold and Natural Resources, a mining and exploration company.

He is a member of the Executive committee of the Trilateral Commission.

References

1933 births
Living people
Fianna Fáil senators
Members of the 14th Seanad
Members of the 19th Seanad
Councillors of Dublin County Council
Local councillors in Dún Laoghaire–Rathdown
People educated at Blackrock College